Rangapara Assembly constituency is one of the 126 assembly constituencies of Assam Legislative Assembly. Rangapara forms part of the Tezpur Lok Sabha constituency.

Members of Legislative Assembly 
 1978: Golok Rajbanshi, Indian National Congress 
 1983: Golok Rajbanshi, Indian National Congress 
 1985: Golok Rajbanshi, Indian National Congress 
 1991: Golok Rajbanshi, Indian National Congress 
 1996: Bhimananda Tanti, Indian National Congress 
 2001: Bhimananda Tanti, Indian National Congress 
 2006: Abhjit Hazarika,Bharatiya Janata Party
 2011: Bhimananda Tanti, Indian National Congress 
 2016: Pallab Lochan Das,Bharatiya Janata Party
 2021: Krishna Kamal Tanti, Bharatiya Janata Party

References 
 

Assembly constituencies of Assam